Olivier Pickeu (born 24 February 1970 in Armentières) is a French retired football forward.

Pickeu started his playing career at Stade Malherbe Caen. He later played at FC Tours and Montpellier HSC (on loan from Caen), Toulouse FC, Amiens SC, Lille OSC, Le Mans Union Club 72, Varzim SC in Portugal, and then Stade de Reims.

After his playing career ended, Pickeu joined the Angers SCO as general manager / sporting director. From 2006 to 2020, he was instrumental in the successes of his club, as it gradually moves from the Championnat National to the middle of Ligue 1. He was laid off in 2020. 

He was appointed as Stade Malherbe Caen chairman in 2020, after club takeover by US fund Oaktree Capital Management.

References

External links

1970 births
Living people
French footballers
Stade Malherbe Caen players
Ligue 1 players
Ligue 2 players
People from Armentières
Sportspeople from Nord (French department)
Tours FC players
Montpellier HSC players
Toulouse FC players
Amiens SC players
Lille OSC players
Le Mans FC players
Varzim S.C. players
Stade de Reims players
French expatriate sportspeople in Portugal
French expatriate footballers
Expatriate footballers in Portugal
French football chairmen and investors
INF Vichy players
France youth international footballers
Association football forwards
Footballers from Hauts-de-France